Měšťan is a surname. Notable people with the surname include:

Ladislav Měšťan (born 1941), Czechoslovak slalom canoeist
Zdeněk Měšťan (born 1944), Czechoslovak slalom canoeist

References